George Ricketts (13 December 1888 – 27 February 1934) was an  Australian rules footballer who played with Geelong in the Victorian Football League (VFL).

Notes

External links 

1888 births
1934 deaths
Australian rules footballers from Victoria (Australia)
Geelong Football Club players
Barwon Football Club players